The R158 road is a regional road in Ireland, linking Trim in County Meath to Kilcock in County Kildare. The road, which is single-carriageway throughout, has been extensively realigned in recent years at a cost of €22m, the section between Kilcock and Summerhill having been completed by Fallon Construction in August 2008.

Route
The road runs in a south-southeasterly direction from a junction with the R161 in Trim by way of Summerhill to a junction with the R148 in Kilcock.

See also
Roads in Ireland
National primary road
National secondary road

References
Roads Act 1993 (Classification of Regional Roads) Order 2006 – Department of Transport

Regional roads in the Republic of Ireland
Roads in County Kildare
Roads in County Meath